McKeen is an unincorporated community in Clark County, Illinois, United States. McKeen is located along a railroad line northeast of Marshall.

References

Unincorporated communities in Clark County, Illinois
Unincorporated communities in Illinois